The Scout and Guide movement in Paraguay is served by
 Asociación Guías Scouts del Paraguay, member of the World Association of Girl Guides and Girl Scouts
 Asociación de Scouts del Paraguay, member of the World Organization of the Scout Movement
 Unión Scout Independiente de Paraguay, member of the Unión Scout Tradicional de América
 Asociación Scout Baden Powell del Paraguay, member of the World Federation of Independent Scouts
 Federación Paraguaya de Escultismo, member of the Confederación interamericana de Scouts independientes
 Agrupación Nacional de Boy Scout del Paraguay

External links

 Unión Scout Independiente de Paraguay
 Agrupación Nacional de Boy Scout del Paraguay
 Asociacion Scout Baden Powell del Paraguay
 Federación Paraguaya de Escultismo